The Indian Association of Special Libraries and Information Centres (IASLIC) is a non-profit organisation based in India that supports development in the entire field of special librarianship in India. The IASLIC undertakes supports, coordinate research and studies, conducts short term training courses; organises general/special meetings, and hold seminars and conferences in alternate years on current problems of Libraries and Information services and other allied areas are selected as themes for discussions on these occasions. It also publishes journals, monographs, manuals, newsletters, papers, proceedings and reports.

History
The association was founded by J. Saha, A. K. Mukherjee and G. B. Ghosh on 3 September 1955 at Kolkata.  Dr. Hora was elected the first President and Mr. J. Saha the first Honorary General Secretary of IASLIC. IASLIC maintains its headquarters at Kolkata.

Membership
Indian Association of Special Libraries and Information Centres (IASLIC) is composed of two kinds of members, namely individual and institutional. IASLIC has its fold most of the important libraries spread all over India as Institutional members, while a sizable number of people in the profession are either life or ordinary members.
 
1. Honorary Members
IASLIC offers honorary membership to the person or institute for their distinguished contribution to the field. The decision is taken by the council.

2. Donor Members
IASLIC offers Donor membership to the person or organisation which has contributed to the IASLIC Monetarily or to the collection of IASLIC Library.

3.  Institutional Members

4.  Individual Members

Publication
IASLIC Bulletin
 IASLIC NewsLetter
Digitization of IASLIC Publications
Information Service Division along with Library Service Division initiated a project to digitize some rare IASLIC publications those are out of print aiming to disseminate the hidden treasures among the learned community.

See also
 List of library associations in India

References

External links
IASLIC Official Website 

Libraries in India
Library associations
Organizations established in 1955
1955 establishments in West Bengal
Organisations based in Kolkata